Tychowo  ( until 1937, then simply Tychow) is a village in the administrative district of Gmina Sławno, within Sławno County, West Pomeranian Voivodeship, in north-western Poland.

History
For the history of the region, see History of Pomerania.

Sigurdshof (today's Waszkowo), an outlying estate (Vorwerk/fołwark) became an outpost of the secret education of pastors for the Nazi-opponent fraction of the united Evangelical Church of the old-Prussian Union, represented by the Confessing Church and its brethren councils, persecuted by the Nazis during the struggle of the churches.

In summer 1939 the Ewald Graf von Kleist-Wendisch Tychow offered his unused outlying estate Sigurdshof to Dietrich Bonhoeffer, Protestant pastor and theologian and head of an underground seminary (Sammelvikariat) for training Confessing-Church pastors, for his seminary. The seminary then moved over from Groß Schlönwitz. The Gestapo forcibly shut down the seminary in March 1940.

References

Villages in Sławno County